The Journal of Language Contact is a peer-reviewed academic journal published in English and French. It covers research on language contact, use, and change. This includes linguistic, anthropological, historical, and cognitive factors. The journal was established in 2007. The editors-in-chief are  Alexandra Aikhenvald (The Cairns Institute, James Cook University) and  Robert Nicolaï (University of Nice Sophia Antipolis).

External links
 

Linguistics journals
Language contact
Brill Publishers academic journals
Publications established in 2007
Multilingual journals